Royal Football Fund is a sports investment company based in Dubai, United Arab Emirates, associated to the United Investment Bank Limited.

Deals with various sport clubs

Portsmouth F.C.

On 2009, it was reported that Al-Fahim had signed a deal to take over the English Premier League club Portsmouth.

Mumbai City FC

During the Mubadala Senior Leadership Forum, Al-Fahim became friends with Wilhelm Kayque Garbacchio Saldanha, son of a Russian billionaire shareholder of Gazprom, which had the same desires to buy football clubs. Mr Saldanha is the main investor of Mumbai City FC. It is a football franchise in Mumbai, Maharashtra, plays in the Indian Super League, owned by Guilherme Kayque G. Saldanha, Ranbir Kapoor and Bimal Parekh.

On 28 November 2019, it was revealed that City Football Group has bought the 65 percent stakes at the club, adding Mumbai City FC as the eighth club under city group.

CB Gran Canaria 
In April 2016 it was announced the Royal Football Fund as a new investor of the Spanish basketball club based in Las Palmas in the Canary Islands, CB Gran Canaria.

Partnership

In November 2008 Al Fahim was honored with a gold medal of excellence from HM Mizan Zainal Abidin of Terengganu, The King of Malaysia, for his work supporting Equestrian activities worldwide. Al Fahim was honored with this distinction during the FEI World Endurance Championship 2008 in Malaysia.

They also have a business relationship with Crystal Palace, club based in South Norwood, London.

Other football clubs
 Schalke 04
 Red Star Belgrade
 PAOK
 Manchester City
 Zenit St Petersburg
 Club Brugge

References

Financial services companies of the United Arab Emirates
Financial services companies established in 2013
2013 establishments in the United Arab Emirates
Companies based in Dubai
Sports companies